John Clarke is an anti-poverty activist who lives in Toronto, Ontario, Canada. As of 2019, he was teaching at York University.

Activism 
A native of Britain, he moved to Toronto, Ontario and became an organizer there. He was a leading figure of the Ontario Coalition Against Poverty (OCAP) group until he retired from it in January 2019. The Globe and Mail reported in the year 2000 that Clarke's "guerrilla activism has pitted him against police countless times during the past decade."

Clarke was arrested with three other activists and charged with inciting a riot for his role in an OCAP protest at Queen's park in June 2000. Clarke appealed his restrictive bail conditions in August 2000. In 2003, a judge stayed the charges and Clarke walked free.

The Sudbury Star described Clarke in 2016 as "a 25-year veteran of activism." In 2019, he announced an online fundraiser asking people to contribute $25,000 for his retirement.

Teaching 
In 2019, Clarke took on the post of Packer Visitor in Social Justice in the faculty of Liberal Arts and Professional Studies at York University. The position is for two years.

References

External links
Justin Podur interviews John Clarke May 2004
John Clarke straight up Eye Magazine July 19, 2001
Rapping with John Clarke Eye Magazine  August 7, 2003

Canadian anti-poverty activists
Living people
Activists from Toronto
Year of birth missing (living people)
British emigrants to Canada
Academic staff of York University